Anna Borisovna Chipovskaya (born 16 June 1987) is a Russian actress who has appeared in theater, television and film.

Early life 
Anna Chipovskaya was born in Moscow, Russian SFSR, Soviet Union. She was born to Olga Chipovskaya, an actress of Vakhtangov Theatre, and Boris Frumkin, a notable jazz musician.

Anna's parents wanted her to become a translator and enrolled her in linguistic high school. In parallel with her studies, she worked for a modeling agency.

She studied until grade 9 and then enrolled in a drama school.

In 2009, Anna graduated from the Moscow Art Theater School and was accepted into the troupe of the Moscow theater studio under the direction of Oleg Tabakov, where she began to play, while still a student. In the same year "Nezavisimaya Gazeta" highlighted her work in the play "Olesya".

Career 
When she was a  student, where is playing the role of a photographer.
She made her movie debut at the age of 16.
In the film debuted in 2003 in the TV series Operation "Color of the nation" and the children spy.
In 2004 followed by roles in the series "Dear Masha Berezina", "Bachelors" and "Lily of the Valley Silver 2".

She acted in the film "Yolki 3" (2013).

She became popular due to the TV series "The Thaw".
The 12-part television series, "The Thaw" (2013), which takes place in the early 1960s, with the participation of developing Anna Chipovskaya main love story line. The image of a young and romantic Maryana Pichugina new and passionate love occurs in the life of the cameraman, professional virtuoso Victor Khrustalyov. Seductive and sexy heroine Anna becomes the first, sometimes agonizing experience in the film and in the relationship to mature in crisis after a recent divorce, a man embodies the rebellious spirit of the sixties – when the dramatic events taking place in it, and on the set, and in the course of the investigation and killing each other, which is involved in a lover Maryana Pichugina.

For his role in the TV series "The Thaw" was nominated for "Golden Eagle" (Film Awards 2015) in the category "Best Actress on Television". However, the award went to Anna Chipovskaya's rival, Viktoriya Isakova. Nevertheless, FashionTime.ru portal noted that after «an actress of such a project has the potential to rise to stardom even in Hollywood».

In 2015, she performed in the Russian version of the American folk song, In the Pines titled "Холодного фронта".

In early 2015, the screens out, fantastic film "The Calculator" (2014), filmed in Iceland, where the partner Anna was Yevgeny Mironov, then the sequel "Love with accent and without" with Rezo Gigineishvili and two more series with Anna Chipovskaya.

She played the female lead in 2015 romantic comedy movie "Horoscope for good luck".

In 2016, rolling out the detective thriller movie "Pure Art" (2016), also nude scenes in which Anna the main lead Sasha.

In February 2016 in "Snuff Box", the premiere of the play "Nameless Star" on the play by playwright Michael Sebastian with elements of melodrama and tragic farce in the railway surroundings. In the play Anna Chipovskaya stars in Mona, her partner – Pavel Tabakov. That same spring on the first channel with the actress goes detective drama "The NBC Mystery town". Anna Chipovskaya – as eccentric, daring and curious Blogersha, put a spoke in the course of a criminal investigation.

She has endorsed perfumes from Avon Products.

Filmography

Film

Television

References

External links 

1987 births
Living people
Russian child actresses
Russian film actresses
Russian television actresses
Russian stage actresses
Actresses from Moscow
21st-century Russian actresses
Musical theatre actresses
Moscow Art Theatre School alumni